The first series of the British children's television series The Dumping Ground began broadcasting on 4 January 2013 on CBBC and ended on 15 March 2013. The series follows the lives of the children living in the fictional children's care home of Elm Tree House, nicknamed by them "The Dumping Ground". It consists of thirteen, thirty-minute episodes. It is the ninth series in The Story of Tracy Beaker franchise.

Series synopsis
Everyone from Series 3 of Tracy Beaker Returns return for this series except Sapphire Fox, Liam O'Donovan and Tracy Beaker. It also sees new characters Faith, Floss (from episode 6) and Mo (from episode 10). Gus leaves after episode 5 and Elektra and Gina leave after the series finale. The opening 2 episodes have the YP being home alone after Mike goes on holiday and Gina goes to hospital. After that, Lily's Dad's girlfriend (Shannay) moves into their flat causing chaos for Lily, Jody lives with her Mum for a while before Carmen and Tyler realise that she's being abused by her older brother (Kingsley), Gus goes through turmoil when he gets the chance to get fostered and does eventually agree to, Faith's history is revealed, new girl Floss bargains Jeff off Harry, Frank gets a job in a cafe after failing his exams and Rick meets his Dad who has been in prison. Towards the end of the series, the DG go on a day trip to a Edwardian mansion and roleplay as Edwardians for the day, new resident Mo causes trouble for some residents, Carmen, Tee and Lily fall out on a sleepover, Tyler does a big practical joke on Elektra, Carmen meets an exotic girl (Esme), and in the finale, Faith's brother suddenly arrives at Elm Tree House, when she believes he's dead.

Cast

Main

Guest

Casting
Screenterrier announced the casting of characters Mo, Floss and Faith in September 2012.

Episodes

References

2013 British television seasons
The Dumping Ground